The International Association for Identification (IAI) is the largest forensic organization in the world. It was originally formed as the "International Association for Criminal Identification" in October 1915. Through the years it has grown into an educational and certification body with over 6,000 members worldwide.

Missions 
The International Association for Identification strives to be the primary professional association for those engaged in forensic identification, investigation, and scientific examination of physical evidence. To accomplish this mission, it has six goals:
 Educate members about the most current information and research in forensic identification.
 Affiliate people who are actively engaged in the profession of forensic identification, investigation, and scientific examination of physical evidence in an organized body. In this way, the profession may be standardized, as well as effectively and scientifically practiced.
 Enlarge and improve the science of forensic identification and crime detection.
 Encourage research in scientific crime detection.
 Employ the collective wisdom of the profession to advance the scientific techniques of forensic identification and crime detection.

Presidents

Awards

John A. Dondero Memorial Award
The award is presented to an Active Member of the Association, who have made "the most significant and valuable contribution in the area of identification and allied sciences." The laureates are:

Dr Antonio A. Cantu Memorial Award for Early Career Research
The award is to be awarded at the discretion of the Board of Directors to a new forensic science practitioner and active member of this association, to highlight the creativity, originality, professionalism, and innovation of his research in the recovery and identification of forensic evidence, in the early stages of his career.

Good of the Association Award
This award recognize an individual who, "in the opinion and judgment of the IAI's Board of Directors, is deemed to have made an "outstanding contribution to the Association." The laureates are:

Distinguished members
Distinguished membership may be conferred only on a Member by a majority vote of the I.A.I. Board of Directors in recognition of the Member's superior efforts in the furtherance of the aims and purposes of the I.A.I. A Distinguished Member retains all the rights, privileges, and obligations of the class of membership he or she held prior to being designated as a Distinguished Member.

Dedication to Service Award
The Dedication to Service Award is awarded to individuals who have shown outstanding dedication over time to the Association and its objectives. The laureates are:

Training 
There are four means of obtaining training through the IAI:
 IAI Sponsored Training Opportunities
 IAI Division Conferences
 International Education Conference
 Vendor/Supplier and Private Training

Certification boards 
There are eight (8) certifying boards:
 Bloodstain Pattern Analysis Certification
 Crime Scene Certification
 Level I -- Certified Crime Scene Investigator
 Level II—Certified Crime Scene Analyst
 Level III—Certified Senior Crime Scene Analyst
 Footwear Certification
 Forensic Art Certification
 Forensic Photography Certification
 Latent Print Certification
 Tenprint Fingerprint Certification
 Tiretrack and Footwear Certification 

The International Association for Identification also participates in Scientific Working Groups (SWGs).

The organization's monthly publication is the Journal of Forensic Identification.

See also 
 Forensic science

References 

 The International Association for Identification at http://www.theiai.org

External links
 Official website
 Journal of Forensic Identification
 The West Virginia & Regional History Center houses the IAI's research collection, some of which has been digitized here: The International Association for Identification (IAI) Collection

Forensics organizations
Organizations established in 1915
International scientific organizations